Enrico Zanetti (born 12 August 1973, Venice) is an Italian politician and tax advisor. He was appointed Secretary of Civic Choice in February 2015.

Biography
Enrico Zanetti was born on 12 August 1973 in Venice; from 1990 to 1998 he moved to Gorizia and graduated in "Economics and Commerce" at the University of Trieste.

He works as a chartered accountant in his office in Venice, and he is a partner and director of an important tax study center based in Turin, "Eutekne".

From 2006 to 2010 he was an adjunct professor at the Ca' Foscari University of Venice and at the same time he was president of the Union of Young Chartered Accountants of Venice. From 2008 to 2012 he headed the Study Center of the National Council of Chartered Accountants and Accounting Experts. 
From 2011 to 2013 he was Vice President of the National Council of the Young Chartered Accountants Union and in the same period he was a member of the Civil Commission of the Italian Accounting Body.

In 2013 he was elected MP into the Civic Choice list, the party founded by the outgoing Prime Minister Mario Monti. He served as Undersecretary and subsequently as Deputy Minister of Economy and Finance in the Renzi Cabinet, from 28 February 2014 to 29 January 2016.

In the 2018 general election he was candidate among the ranks of Us with Italy, but he was not re-elected.

References

1973 births
Living people
Politicians of Veneto
Politicians from Venice
Linguists
Civic Choice politicians
21st-century Italian politicians
Members of the Chamber of Deputies (Italy)
Renzi Cabinet